KNWH (1250 AM) is a radio station licensed to Yucca Valley, California. It airs a news-talk format and is part of a simulcast with 970 KNWZ and 1140 KNWQ. It is owned by Alpha Media.

History
The station began broadcasting April 3, 1961, and held the call sign KDHI. It was originally licensed to Twenty-Nine Palms, California, and ran 1,000 watts during daytime hours only. It was owned by Hi-Desert Broadcasting Company.

In 1993, the station adopted an oldies format. In December 1994, its call sign was changed to KQYN and it adopted a classic rock format. In October 1995, the station adopted an adult standards format. KQYN later aired an all-news format, with programming from CNN.

In 2005, the station was sold to Morris Communications for $100,000. Its call sign was changed to KNWH, and it adopted a news-talk format, simulcasting KNWQ and KNWZ. On January 15, 2007, its call sign was briefly changed to KDGR, but on February 1, 2007 it was changed back to KNWH.

References

External links

News and talk radio stations in the United States
NWH
Mass media in San Bernardino County, California
Radio stations established in 1961
1961 establishments in California
Alpha Media radio stations